Donald Stuart Russell (February 22, 1906 – February 22, 1998) was an American attorney from South Carolina who served as Assistant Secretary of State for Administration, President of the University of South Carolina, governor of South Carolina, U.S. Senator from South Carolina, United States district judge of the United States District Court for the District of South Carolina and United States circuit judge of the United States Court of Appeals for the Fourth Circuit.

Early life and education 

Russell was born on February 22, 1906, in the unincorporated community of Lafayette Springs in Lafayette County, Mississippi, his father dying the year of his birth. In 1914, he moved with his family to Chester, South Carolina. He received an Artium Baccalaureus degree from the University of South Carolina in 1925.

Russell received a Bachelor of Laws from University of South Carolina School of Law and passed the South Carolina bar in 1928. He studied graduate level law at the University of Michigan Law School in 1929.

Early career 
Russell was in private practice of law in Union, South Carolina, from 1929 to 1930. He was in private practice of law with the law firm of Nichols, Wyche and Byrnes in Spartanburg, South Carolina, from 1930 to 1942. He was in private practice of law in Spartanburg from 1947 to 1951 and from 1957 to 1963. Additionally, Russell served as president of the University of South Carolina from 1951 to 1957.

Ruseell served on the Price Adjustment Board of the War Department and as assistant director of economic stabilization in 1942, and in 1943 became an assistant to the director of war mobilization. Russell was in the United States Army as a major in 1944 and became deputy director of the Office of War Mobilization Reconversion in 1945.

Service as Assistant Secretary of State 
In 1947, Russell began service as Assistant Secretary of State for Administration.  He was a protégé of former Secretary of State James F. Byrnes.  During that time, he became involved in the case of "Mr. Blank" and nine other State Department officials, dismissed for unspecified charges related to loyalty.  The case became a sensation when journalist Bert Andrews obtained a secret transcript of Mr. Blank's case and published a series of articles in the New York Herald-Tribune starting on November 2, 1947.

Governor of South Carolina 
In 1958, he ran unsuccessfully for Governor of South Carolina, losing the Democratic primary to Ernest F."Fritz" Hollings. In 1962, he was elected the 107th Governor of South Carolina, and would serve from 1963 to 1965. On April 22, 1965, Russell resigned as governor, after which new governor Robert E. McNair appointed him to fill the seat vacated by the death of Olin D. Johnston as Democratic Senator, through 1966.

Notable events during his tenure 
On January 28, 1963, Clemson University enrolled its first-ever African-American student, Harvey Gantt, who would later become Mayor of Charlotte. On September 16, 1964, former Governor Strom Thurmond announced his move to the Republican Party. On October 29, 1964, Greenville native Charles Townes won the Nobel Prize in Physics. On November 3, 1964, a majority of South Carolina voters supported Barry Goldwater, the first Republican presidential candidate to carry the state since Reconstruction.

Federal judicial service 

Russell was nominated by President Lyndon B. Johnson on October 11, 1966, to a seat on the United States District Court for the District of South Carolina vacated by the death of Judge Charles Cecil Wyche. He was confirmed to this office by his fellow members of the United States Senate on October 20, 1966, and received his commission on November 3, 1966. His service was terminated on May 1, 1971, due to his elevation to the Fourth Circuit.

Russell was nominated by President Richard Nixon on April 7, 1971, to a seat on the United States Court of Appeals for the Fourth Circuit vacated by Judge Simon Sobeloff. He was confirmed by the Senate on April 21, 1971, and received his commission on April 23, 1971. His service was terminated on February 22, 1998, due to his death.

Relationship with James F. Byrnes 

Russell's most notable political/professional relationship was with James F. Byrnes:     Russell's relationship with Byrnes became very important over the following years, particularly as Byrnes took on increasingly prominent positions in the Roosevelt administration. Russell went to Washington as Byrnes' assistant when Byrnes was appointed director of the Office of Economic Stabilization in October 1942. In May 1943, Russell followed Byrnes to the Office of War Mobilization and Reconversion, which Byrnes had been appointed to direct. In October 1944 Russell went on active duty serving at the Army's Supreme Allied Headquarters in Europe. Major Russell was discharged later that year. In early 1945, Russell served as Deputy Director of the Office of War Mobilization and Reconversion, then as Assistant Secretary of State for Administration, under Byrnes, from August 1945 to January 1947. Russell implemented plans for the reorganization of the Foreign Service and developed the first series of continual regional foreign policy statements, which was later to become standard practice. Russell's interest in the foreign service later led to his involvement on several federal committees. As the assistant to Byrnes, Russell was at Potsdam with President Harry Truman and Byrnes and took part in the decision to drop the first atomic bomb. Byrnes and Russell left the administration shortly after the war ended and joined Hogan & Hartson, a Washington, D.C., law firm.

Personal life, death and legacy 

Russell was a Methodist. Russell married Virginia Utsey; they had four children. Russell died on his 92nd birthday, February 22, 1998. His Spartanburg home was listed on the National Register of Historic Places in 2007. When he died, he left an estate of over $30 million ($50 million in 2018), which he gained through sound investments in banks, insurance and utility companies.

References

External links 
 
 
Donald S. Russell Papers at South Carolina Political Collections, University of South Carolina
 SCIway Biography of Donald Stuart Russell
 NGA Biography of Donald Stuart Russell
 
Governor Donald S. Russell Collection (RG 550000) at the South Carolina Department of Archives & History

1906 births
1998 deaths
20th-century American judges
20th-century American lawyers
Methodists from South Carolina
Burials in South Carolina
Democratic Party governors of South Carolina
Democratic Party United States senators from South Carolina
Judges of the United States Court of Appeals for the Fourth Circuit
Judges of the United States District Court for the Western District of South Carolina
Presidents of the University of South Carolina
United States court of appeals judges appointed by Richard Nixon
United States district court judges appointed by Lyndon B. Johnson
University of Michigan Law School alumni
University of South Carolina alumni
University of South Carolina trustees